Ju Xue (born 22 November 1968), is a Chinese actress.

Selected filmography

Film

Television Series

References

External links

1968 births
Living people
Chinese film actresses
Chinese television actresses